No Limit Tour, also known as Monsta X Tour: No Limit, is the fourth concert tour by the South Korean boy group Monsta X following their successful online live concert Live From Seoul With Luv in 2020, and their first since We Are Here World Tour in 2019, due to COVID-19 pandemic. Originally, it was supposed to be a U.S. tour only, which started on May 21, six months after the release of their tenth EP No Limit, presented by Lexus, kicking off in New York, and then visiting eight more states including Virginia, Michigan, Illinois, Florida, Georgia, Texas, Arizona, and California, but on a later date, Seoul had been added.

Background

2020
On January 13, Starship Entertainment released the teaser poster for Monsta X's world tour through the group's official SNS channel, with their first performance to be held in Seoul, at the Olympic Gymnastics Arena from May 9 to 10. 

On April 6, the agency posted a notice on its official Twitter that the Seoul concert in May had been cancelled due to concerns about the spread of COVID-19 and they would secure a new Seoul concert schedule while monitoring the situation.

In May, Starship Entertainment announced that their North American tour, which was scheduled to be held in the U.S. and Canada from June to July, is temporarily postponed. This decision was made to protect the health of the audience, artists, and staff.

On July 14, Monsta X had decided to hold an overseas tour, which has been postponed due to COVID-19, in the end of next year. Their agency announced this news through their official SNS.

On August 9, Monsta X held their first online live concert Live From Seoul With Luv, presented by LiveXLive (now LiveOne).

2021
As announced from last year, Monsta X was scheduled to hold their world tour in the U.S. and Canada, beginning April 20 until May 21, and will be visiting fourteen cities, starting in Washington, D.C. and then hold their final concert in Los Angeles.

As it was postponed for the second time, Monsta X released their first documentary film and concert film Monsta X: The Dreaming to appease the disappointment of the face-to-face meeting with their fans, who are limited by the current situation.

2022
 

After postponing their planned North American tour twice due to the COVID-19 pandemic, Monsta X announced the new dates, beginning January 20 until February 27, and will be visiting thirteen cities, starting in New York and then hold their final concert in Los Angeles.

After the postponement at a later date, Monsta X successfully conducted their U.S. tour in three years, which began on May 21 until June 11, starting in New York and then held their final concert in Los Angeles.

In September, Monsta X held their Seoul tour for three days, at the SK Olympic Handball Gymnasium, located at Seoul Olympic Park, on September 2, 3 and 4.

Promotion
During Monsta X's 3-days Seoul tour, Dalcomsoft's rhythm game Superstar Starship held field event, wherein booth at the group's concert site, their physical card goods are provided when you purchase a song play event, mission certification, and promotional products that are only held on site.

Release
On the last day of Monsta X's Seoul performance, it has received a lot of response from field communication after a long time, as well as a LAN communication through the online live concert streaming service and concert series Beyond Live.

Commercial performance
The tour gathered 29,229 attendees, with a gross sales of $3,302,773 for five reported shows out of thirteen total shows.

Impact
Monsta X earned their highest grossing concert of all time, with $1,318,000 from 11,600 tickets sold at Kia Forum in Inglewood, California on June 11.

Monsta X also showed overwhelming ticket power by selling out all seats for the 3-days Seoul tour, at the same time as the fan club pre-sale tickets were opened.

Setlist

INTRO VCR
 "Gambler"                                                                         
 "Dramarama"                                                                                      
 "Rush Hour" 
MENT      
 "Heaven"  
 "Just Love"                                                                       
 "Burn It Up"  
MENT                                                                                     
 "One Day"  
 "Play It Cool"
MENT
 "You Problem"
VCR
 "Find You"
 "U R"
 "And"
MENT
 "Wildfire" – Hyungwon
 "God Damn" and "Happy to Die" – I.M
 "Ongsimi" – Minhyuk

 "Rain" – Kihyun
 "Smoky" and "Voices" – Joohoney
VCR
 "Mercy"
 "Love Killa"
MENT
 "Love"
MENT
 "Beastmode"
 "Zone"
 "Fallin'"
MENT
 "Stand Together"
ENDING MENT
 "Saranghanda"
ENDING VCR

Notes:
 included in the Seoul setlist only
 included in the United States setlist only

Tour dates

Notes

References

External links
  

Monsta X concert tours
2022 concert tours
K-pop concerts
Beyond Live
Concert tours of North America
Concert tours of South Korea
Concert tours of the United States